
Year 806 (DCCCVI) was a common year starting on Thursday (link will display the full calendar) of the Julian calendar.

Events 
 By place 

 Asia 
 February 5 – Emperor Kanmu dies after a 25-year reign, that has seen Korean culture and technology introduced to Japan. He is succeeded by his son Heizei, as the 51st emperor of Japan.
 Hōzen-ji Temple is founded in Wakakusa, Nakakoma District, Japan (now Minami-Alps, Yamanashi Prefecture). The temple follows the Shingon sect of Japanese Buddhism.

 Abbasid Caliphate 
 Arab–Byzantine wars: Caliph Harun al-Rashid leads a huge military  expedition, assembling men from Syria, Palestine, Persia, and Egypt. The invasion army (reportedly 135,000 men) departs from Raqqa, residence of Harun, and enters Cappadocia through the Cilician Gates, sacking several Byzantine fortresses and cities. Heraclea is captured after a month-long siege (August/September). The city is plundered and razed; its inhabitants are enslaved and deported to the Abbasid Caliphate.

 Arab–Byzantine wars: An Abbasid fleet under Humayd ibn Ma'yuf al-Hajuri raids Cyprus, carrying off 16,000 inhabitants as slaves.
 Harun al-Rashid appoints Ashot Msaker ("the Carnivorous") as the new presiding prince of Armenia. The Bagratids emerge as one of the country's two most powerful noble families. Harun recognizes another Bagratid branch, under Ashot I Curopalates, as princes of Caucasian Iberia.
 Rafi ibn al-Layth, an Arab nobleman, leads a large-scale rebellion against oppressive taxation by the Abbasid governor Ali ibn Isa ibn Mahan. He launches a revolt in Samarkand, which spreads quickly across Khorasan.

 Britain 
 Vikings massacre Columba's monks, and all the inhabitants on the island of Iona (Scotland). Other monks flee to safety in the monastery of Kells (Ireland). They take with them the Book of Kells.
 King Eardwulf of Northumbria is expelled from his kingdom by his rival Ælfwald II, who takes the throne. Eardwulf flees to the Frankish court of Charlemagne, and later visits Pope Leo III in Rome.

 Europe 
 November – Al-Hakam I, Umayyad emir of Córdoba, reasserts his control over the city of Toledo, autonomous since 797. To this effect Al-Hakam has over 72 nobles (accounts talk of 5,000) massacred at a banquet, crucified and displayed along the banks of the Guadalquivir River (modern Spain), in what comes to be known as the "Day of the Trench".
 Emperor Charlemagne divides the Frankish Empire under his three sons, called Divisio Regnorum. For Charles the Younger he designates the imperial title, Austrasia and Neustria, Saxony, Burgundy, and Thuringia. To Pepin he gives Italy, Bavaria, and Swabia. His youngest son Louis the Pious receives Aquitaine, the Spanish March, and Provence.
 Grimoald III, Lombard duke of Benevento, dies without heirs. He is succeeded by Grimoald IV, who is forced to pay tribute to King Charles the Younger.

 By topic 

 Religion 
 April 12 – Nikephoros I is elected patriarch of Constantinople, succeeding Tarasios.
 The church (oratory) in Germigny-des-Prés is built by Bishop Theodulf of Orléans.
 July 26 – Wulfred is elected Archbishop of Canterbury.

Births 
 Hincmar, archbishop of Reims (d. 882)
 Leuthard II, Frankish count (approximate date)
 Ralpacan, king of Tibet (approximate date)

Deaths 
 February 5 – Kanmu, emperor of Japan (b. 737)
 February 11 – Shun Zong, emperor of the Tang Dynasty (b. 761)
 February 25 – Tarasios, patriarch of Constantinople
 July 19 – Li Shigu, general of the Tang Dynasty (b. 778)
 Grimoald III, Lombard prince of Benevento
 Miliduch, prince (knyaz) of the Sorbs (approximate date)  
 Muhammad ibn Ibrahim al-Fazari, Muslim philosopher (or 796)
 Yahya ibn Khalid, Persian vizier of Bagdad

References

Sources